The National Division One (currently known as the Mowi National Division' for sponsorship reasons) is the second tier of the Shinty league system

Initially formed in 1999, the league folded in 2006 due to financial constraints before its reinstatement in 2014.

Current Teams 
The 2023 Mowi National Division will consist of the following teams:
Col-Glen Shinty Club
Lochaber Camanachd
Fort William Shinty Club
Kilmallie Shinty Club
Glenurquhart Shinty Club
Oban Celtic
Inverary Shinty Club
Strathglass Shinty Club

History 
1999 to 2005: Original conception of National Division One which had relegation and promotion to the Premier Division.

2005: League folded to due financial constraints

2014: National Division One reinstated

2015: Fort William and Oban Camanachd promoted to an expanded Premiership, while Bute voluntary dropped to South Division One. Inverness, who had finished bottom of North Division One in 2014 promoted in lieu with all other teams choosing to stay put for financial reasons. On the eve of the season opener, Glenorchy pulled out of the league leaving only 7 teams.

List of winners (since 2014)

2014 - Fort William Shinty Club
2015 - Skye Camanachd
2016 - Kilmallie Shinty Club
2017 - Skye Camanachd
2018 - Kilmallie Shinty Club
2019 - Fort William Shinty Club
2020 - No season due to Covid-19 pandemic
2021 - N/A
2022 - Skye Camanachd

References

External links
Scottish Hydro Premier Division

Shinty competitions